Xtal is an informal abbreviation for crystals (as a reference designator on printed circuit boards).

Xtal may also refer to:

 X-tal, a San Francisco-based rock band
 Xtal DOS, the operating system for the Tatung Einstein personal computer
 "Xtal", a track by Aphex Twin from the 1992 album Selected Ambient Works 85–92
 XTAL, a market identifier code for the European stock exchange in Tallinn, Estonia

See also
 Crystal (disambiguation)